Luis Alberto Castiglioni Soria (born 31 July 1962) is a Paraguayan politician. He was Vice President of Paraguay for the Colorado Party from 2003 to 2007.

Career
Castiglioni was born in Itacurubí del Rosario and obtained a qualification in civil engineering from the Catholic University of Asunción. His national political career began in 1984 as leader of Colorado party's juvenile wing. In 2003 Nicanor Duarte chose him as his running mate in the 2003 presidential election. Castiglioni served as Vice President of Paraguay from 15 August 2003 to October 2007, when he resigned in order to pursue the presidency.

He was a candidate for the Colorado Party's nomination in the April 2008 presidential election. Initial results in the December 2007 party primary election showed rival candidate Blanca Ovelar, who is backed by President Nicanor Duarte, narrowly defeating Castiglioni; however, the result was disputed, leading to a recount. On 21 January 2008, the Colorado Party electoral commission announced that Ovelar had won with 45.04% of the vote against 44.5% for Castiglioni.  Castiglioni said that he would never accept defeat, claiming to have proof that 30,000 votes in his favor were "stolen", and said that he would take the matter to court.

References

1962 births
Living people
People from San Pedro Department, Paraguay
Paraguayan people of Italian descent
Colorado Party (Paraguay) politicians
Vice presidents of Paraguay
Foreign Ministers of Paraguay
Government ministers of Paraguay
Members of the Chamber of Deputies of Paraguay
Members of the Senate of Paraguay
Paraguayan engineers
Universidad Católica Nuestra Señora de la Asunción alumni